Pyeonghae Gu clan is one of the Korean clans. Their Bon-gwan is in Uljin County, North Gyeongsang Province. According to the research held in 2015, the number of Pyeonghae Gu clan’s member was 15297. Their founder was  who was a general in Tang dynasty. He had a shipwreck on the Sea of Japan on his way to Japan as an envoy in Tang dynasty. Then, he cast ashore in North Gyeongsang Province and was settled in Mipo located in the south of the ocean.

See also 
 Korean clan names of foreign origin

References

External links 
 

 
Korean clan names of Chinese origin
Gu clans